Izabela Rodrigues da Silva (born 2 August 1995) is a Brazilian athlete specialising in the discus throw. She won a gold medal at the 2014 World Junior Championships. She competed at the 2020 Summer Olympics.

Her personal best in the event is 63.04 metres set in Montreuil, France, in 2022.

International competitions

References

External links
 

1995 births
Living people
Brazilian female discus throwers
Athletes (track and field) at the 2020 Summer Olympics
Olympic athletes of Brazil
South American Championships in Athletics winners
Sportspeople from São Paulo (state)
21st-century Brazilian women